Saila is a name. Variations include Säilä. Use

List of people with the given name 

 Saila Kinni (born 1987), Finnish orienteering competitor
 Saila Ithayaraj (born 1977), Sri Lankan women's rights activist
 Saila Laakkonen, Finnish actress
 Saila Saari (born 1989), Finnish ice hockey player
 Saila Quicklund (born 1961), Swedish politician

List of people with the surname 

 Pauta Saila (1916 or 1917–2009), Inuit artist
 Pekka Säilä (1941–2009), Finnish tennis player
 Pitaloosie Saila (born 1942), Inuit artist

See also 
 Sala (disambiguation)

Given names
Surnames
Feminine given names
Finnish feminine given names
Swedish feminine given names
Surnames of North American origin
Native American surnames